The teams competing in Group 7 of the 2011 UEFA European Under-21 Championships qualifying competition were England, Greece, Lithuania, Macedonia, and Portugal.

Standings

Matches

Goalscorers 
As of 7 September, there have been 52 goals scored over 20 games, for an average of 2.6 goals per game.

1 goal

Own Goals
  Kieran Gibbs (for Macedonia)

References 
 UEFA.com

9
2010–11 in English football
2009–10 in English football